The Weeden House Museum is a historic two-story house in Huntsville, Alabama. It was built in 1819 for Henry C. Bradford, and designed in the Federal architectural style. Until 1845, it was sold and purchased by several home owners, including John McKinley, who served as a Congressman, Senator, and Associate Justice of the Supreme Court of the United States. From 1845 to 1956, it belonged to the Weeden family. During the American Civil War of 1861-1865, the Union Army took over the house while the Weedens moved to Tuskegee; they moved back in after the war. Portraitist and poet Maria Howard Weeden spent most of her life in the house. After it was sold by the Weeden family in 1956, the house was remodelled into residential apartments. In 1973, it was purchased by the city of Huntsville and the Twickenham Historic Preservation District Association restored it before they acquired it from the city. The private residence became a house museum in 1981.

References

External links
Weeden House Museum

Houses completed in 1819
1819 establishments in Alabama
Houses in Huntsville, Alabama
Historic house museums in Alabama
Federal architecture in Alabama